Wattisham is a village and civil parish near to the town of Stowmarket in Suffolk, England. From the 2011 Census the population of the parish was 110, according to the ONS, included in the civil parish of Hitcham.

Wattisham Airfield

The village houses an airfield.  Formerly known as RAF Wattisham, it was one of the front-line airfields in the Cold War. The RAF moved out in March 1993 and it is now the largest Army Air Corps airfield in the United Kingdom. The airbase is now named Wattisham Airfield.

Landmarks
The parish church of St Nicholas, was declared redundant by Diocese of St Edmundsbury and Ipswich in the 1970s but was taken over by a charitable trust, who use it for concerts and exhibitions, with profits reinvested into caring for the building. Diocesan architect Henry Munro Cautley (1875-1959), in his 1937 Suffolk Churches and their Treasures, found little to interest him except an armorial shield.

North of the village is Wattisham Castle, dating from the eighteenth and nineteenth centuries.
The Wattisham Strict Baptist Chapel is located in the village.

References

External links

Villages in Suffolk
Babergh District
Civil parishes in Suffolk